Scaglia is an extinct genus of South American astrapotherid land mammal that lived during the Eocene (Casamayoran to Divisaderan in the SALMA classification).

Etymology 
The genus was named after Argentinian naturalist Galileo Juan Scaglia, and the type species after Argentinian palaeontologist Lucas Kraglievich.

Description 
Its type specimen, recovered from the Sarmiento Formation of Argentina, is MMCNT-MdP 207. Like Albertogaudrya, Scaglia was the size of a sheep or a small tapir, hence among the larger mammals in South America at that time.

Phylogeny 
Cladogram according to Bond et al., 2011, standing out the phylogenetic position of Scaglia:

References

Bibliography

Further reading 

 
 

Meridiungulata
Eocene mammals of South America
Divisaderan
Mustersan
Casamayoran
Paleogene Argentina
Fossils of Argentina
Fossil taxa described in 1957
Taxa named by George Gaylord Simpson
Prehistoric placental genera
Golfo San Jorge Basin
Sarmiento Formation